Royal Australian Air Force is the aerial warfare branch of the Australian Defence Force.

RAAF may also refer to:
Roswell Army Air Field, later Walker Air Force Base
Royal Auxiliary Air Force
Royal Auxiliary Air Force (Police)
, Polish organization

See also
Raaff